Hold Me is the fourth studio album by American singer Laura Branigan, released on July 15, 1985, by Atlantic Records. The album peaked at number 71 on the US Billboard 200, though it fared better internationally, reaching the top 10 in Sweden and Switzerland, and the top 15 in Norway.

The album's lead single, "Spanish Eddie", earned Branigan her sixth top-40 entry in two and a half years, peaking at number 40 on the Billboard Hot 100, and was moderately successful outside the United States. Subsequent singles "Hold Me" and "I Found Someone" failed to make an impact, peaking at numbers 82 and 90 on the Billboard Hot 100, respectively. Nevertheless, "Hold Me" reached number 39 on Billboards Hot Dance/Disco Club Play chart, while "I Found Someone" reached number 25 on the Hot Adult Contemporary chart.

The track "When the Heat Hits the Streets" was used in a television advertising campaign for the Chrysler Laser, with Chrysler serving as a sponsor for Branigan's 1985–1986 Hold Me tour (a Chrysler Laser was prominently displayed in the "Spanish Eddie" music video).

According to Branigan, she said "the album is such a growth from my other albums. I really feel it’s the direction I want to go. My voice is definitely stronger and the material is just incredible. I honestly don't feel there are any fillers."

Track listing

Notes
  signifies an associate producer

Personnel
Credits adapted from the liner notes of Hold Me.

Musicians

 Laura Branigan – vocals
 Harold Faltermeyer – arrangements ; all keyboards and synthesizers (including programming, electronic drums and bass)
 Mark Spiro – arrangements ; all keyboards and synthesizers (including programming, electronic drums and bass), background vocals
 Eddie Arkin – arrangements ; all keyboards and synthesizers (including programming, electronic drums and bass)
 Tom Keane – arrangements 
 Gary Usher – arrangements 
 Jerry Hey – horn arrangement, horn ; flugelhorn 
 Dann Huff, Michael Landau, Craig T. Cooper – guitars
 Gary Herbig, Marc Russo – saxophone solos
 Gary Grant, Larry Williams, Bill Reichenbach Jr. – horns 
 Nathan Alford Jr. – percussion
 Brian Malouf – percussion, all keyboards and synthesizers (including programming, electronic drums and bass)
 Nathan East, Larry Ball – bass
 Bo Tomlyn, Michael Boddicker, Alan J. Pasqua, Steve Williams, Richard Ruttenberg, Michael Egizi, Michael Mason – all keyboards and synthesizers (including programming, electronic drums and bass)
 James Ingram, Jon Joyce, Richard Page, Joe Pizzulo, Jim Haas, Tom Kelly, Phillip Ingram, Beth Andersen, Maxine Anderson, Leslie Spiro, Kelly Bruss, Edie Lehmann, Andrea Robinson, Rod Burton, Kevin Dorsey, Tommy Funderburk, Kyle Henderson, George Merrill, Susan Boyd, Rosemary Butler, Jill Colucci, Angie Jaree – background vocals

Technical

 Jürgen Koppers, Brian Malouf, John Kovarek, Brian Reeves, John Van Nest, Ed Thacker, Dave Concors, Tom Whitlock, David Devore – engineering
 Steve Krause, Rick Butz, Peggy McAffee, Samii Taylor – engineering assistance
 Jürgen Koppers – mixing
 Brian Gardner – mastering
 Jack White – production 
 Harold Faltermeyer – production 
 Mark Spiro – associate production ; production

Artwork
 Aaron Rapoport – photography
 Bob Defrin – art direction

Charts

Weekly charts

Year-end charts

Notes

References

1985 albums
Albums produced by Harold Faltermeyer
Albums produced by Jack White (music producer)
Albums recorded at Westlake Recording Studios
Atlantic Records albums
Laura Branigan albums